Territorial Council elections were held in French Somaliland on 18 November 1963. Ali Aref Bourhan was elected President of the Executive Council following the elections.

Electoral system
The elections were held using plurality voting in seven districts, with voters casting votes for candidate lists.

Results

By ethnicity

Aftermath
Following the elections, Ali Aref Bourhan was elected Vice-President of the Assembly by a vote of 27–5.

References

French Somaliland
1963 in French Somaliland
Elections in Djibouti
November 1963 events in Africa
Election and referendum articles with incomplete results